A cutting board (or chopping board) is a durable board on which to place material for cutting. The kitchen cutting board is commonly used in preparing food; other types exist for cutting raw materials such as leather or plastic. Kitchen cutting boards are often made of wood or plastic and come in various widths and sizes. There are also cutting boards made of glass, steel, or marble, which are easier to clean than wooden or plastic ones such as nylon or corian, but tend to damage knives due to their hardness. Rough cutting edges—such as serrated knives—abrade and damage a cutting surface more rapidly than do smooth cutting implements.

Materials 
A knife edge is a delicate structure and can easily be blunted by a too abrasive surface. Alternatively, it can be chipped if used on a surface that is too hard. A good cutting board material must be soft, easy to clean, and non-abrasive, but not fragile to the point of being destroyed. Hard cutting boards can, however, be used for food preparation tasks that do not require a sharp knife, like cutting cheese or making sandwiches.

Wood

Wood has some advantages over plastic in that it is somewhat self-healing; shallow cuts in the wood will close up on their own. Wood also has natural anti-septic properties.

Hardwoods with tightly grained wood and small pores are best for wooden cutting boards. Good hardness and tight grain help reduce scoring of the cutting surface and absorption of liquid and dirt into the surface. Red oak, even though a hardwood, has large pores which retain dirt even after washing. This makes it a poor choice for cutting-board material. 

Teak's tight grains and natural coloration make it a highly attractive cutting-board material, both for aesthetic and durability purposes. Teak, a tropical wood, contains tectoquinones, components of natural oily resins that repel moisture, fungi, warping, rot and microbes. Wooden boards can also be refinished with sanding and a reapplication of oil and wax.

Wood boards need to be cared for with an edible mineral oil to avoid warping, and should not be left in puddles of liquid. Ideally, they should be suspended freely while drying. Care must be taken when selecting wood, especially tropical hardwood, for use as a cutting board, as some species contain toxins or allergens.

Bamboo
Bamboo cutting boards are an alternative to plastic or glass cutting boards, partially because bamboo is commonly thought to be naturally antimicrobial (although studies show otherwise). During the harvesting process, bamboo is carefully chosen for maturation, markings, and size. The stalk is then cut into specific sizes and sent through a pressing process that strips the stalks into smaller plank-like pieces. Once the bamboo is pliable, a cutting board can be produced from multiple pieces by lamination. Bamboo has not been used historically in Asian nations due to its extreme hardness.

Plastic

Plastic boards are usually called PE (polyethylene) cutting boards, or HDPE (high-density polyethylene plastic), the material of which these boards are made. There are basically two types of HDPE boards being made. One version is made from injection-molded plastic, while the other is HDPE from an extrusion line. 

There are several certifications of plastic cutting boards, one being NSF, that certifies the plastic has passed requirements to come in contact with food. Unlike wood, plastic has no inherent antiseptic properties. However, unlike wood, plastic boards do allow rinsing with harsher cleaning chemicals such as bleach and other disinfectants without damage to the board or retention of the chemicals to later contaminate food. 

Most high-density polyethylene plastic (HDPE) boards are specifically designed not to dull the edge of a knife. If a score line is present, the knife is safe. A serrated knife should not be used on a plastic cutting board. The sharper the knife, the longer the cutting board will last. Semi-disposable thin flexible cutting boards also ease transferring their contents to a cooking or storage vessel.

Silicone
Like rubber, silicone is soft on the blade, while being just as self-healing and anti-bacterial as wood. Silicone is also heat-resistant, and lacks the rubbery smell of rubber boards.

Glass
While glass looks like an easy surface to keep clean, glass cutting boards can damage knives because of the high hardness of the material. Cutting on glass tends to dent, roll or even chip knife edges in a rapid manner. Additionally, if used for chopping instead of slicing, glass can shatter or chip itself, contaminating food.

Steel
Steel shares with glass the advantages of the durability and ease of cleaning, as well as the tendency to damage knives. Depending on the exact steel and heat treatment used, at best a steel cutting board will wear the edge on knives quickly; at worst chip, dent, or roll it like glass.

Hygiene
Sanitation with cutting boards is a delicate process because bacteria can reside in grooves produced by cutting, or in liquids left on the board.

Preventing cross contamination of food
Bacteria or allergens can easily be transmitted from one part of the kitchen to another or from one food to another via knives, hands, or surfaces such as chopping boards. To reduce the chance of this it is advised to use separate boards for different types of food such as raw meat, cooked meat, dairy and vegetables. Many professional kitchens follow this standard colour-coding system:
 Blue cutting boards: raw seafood.
 Red cutting boards: raw red meat.
 Green cutting boards: vegetables and fruits.
 Yellow cutting boards: poultry
 Brown cutting boards: cooked meat
 White cutting boards: dairy and breads (also for universal if no other board is available.)

Care of boards
Regardless of the material, regular maintenance of a cutting board is important. A very diluted bleach solution is best for disinfecting cutting boards. To remove odors, the board can be rinsed and then rubbed with coarse salt and left to stand for several minutes before being wiped and rinsed clean. In a wooden board, this procedure will also smooth out minor imperfections on the surface.

Wooden boards
Wooden boards should never be placed in the dishwasher, or left immersed for long periods, as the wood or glue may be affected. To prevent cracking, wood cutting boards should be treated monthly, under normal usage. A standard recommendation is 5–7 times a year, or as needed. A light food-grade mineral oil is a good preservative for wooden cutting boards, as it helps keep water from seeping into the grain. Alternatively, one may also use a food-grade drying oil such as poppyseed oil, tung oil or linseed oil. The first two dry much faster than linseed. Note, plant based oils will go rancid, and cause wood cutting boards to pick up unpleasant smells.

Most commercially available linseed and tung oils are not “food grade”, as they contain metallic driers. In general, edible savory vegetable or olive oils are not recommended because they tend to go rancid, causing the board to smell and food to pick up the rancid taste. When heavily or deeply scored, wooden boards need to be resurfaced as scoring can harbour bacteria. Boards can be easily resurfaced with various woodworking tools, such as scrapers or planes, even sandpaper.

Plastic boards
Unlike wood, most plastic boards are non-porous, which means that bacteria can't enter below the surface. It is still equally as important to clean the boards thoroughly after each use as bacteria can lie and grow in any imperfections on the surface. Although many boards are dishwasher safe, both domestic and professional boards which are HDPE will be warped by the hot water, making them unsafe. When heavily or deeply scored, boards need to be resurfaced as scoring can harbour mildew and bacteria. However, resurfacing a plastic cutting board is quite difficult and replacing it is recommended instead.

Bacterial contamination 
One 1994 study found that wood was more likely to retain bacterial contamination, while another 1994 study found the opposite. In 2002, another study found that pine wood in particular had antibacterial properties, while two other types of wood did not reduce bacteria relative to plastic.

While pine has been found to have antibacterial properties, it is not typically used as a cutting board because it is a "softwood".

In 2005, a study found that oak was followed by pine in antibacterial properties. Oak is also not a common cutting board material due to its relatively large pore size.

Another study in 2012 found that bamboo had high antimicrobial activity compared to wood.

In 2016, a literature review summarizing wood and microbial safety was published.

See also 

 Butcher block

References 

Food preparation utensils